The 2009 Grand Prix of Mosport presented by Mobil 1 is the eighth round of the 2009 American Le Mans Series season.  It took place at Mosport International Raceway, Bowmanville, Ontario, Canada on August 30, 2009.  David Brabham and Scott Sharp won their second straight ALMS race for Patrón Highcroft Racing Acura, while drivers Adrian Fernández and Luis Díaz and the Lowe's Fernández Racing Acura team secured their respective LMP2 championships with victory at Mosport, their seventh of the season.  Corvette Racing earned their first victory since the team moved to the GT2 category two rounds prior.  The ALMS Challenge category did not participate in this event due to the high speed differences between various classes.

Report

Qualifying

Qualifying result
Pole position winners in each class are marked in bold.

Race

Race result
Class winners are marked in bold. Cars failing to complete 70% of winner's distance marked as Not Classified (NC).

References

External links
 2009 Grand Prix of Mosport Race Broadcast (American Le Mans Series YouTube Channel)

Mosport
Grand Prix of Mosport
2009 in Canadian motorsport